is a public museum that opened in Shimonoseki, Yamaguchi Prefecture, Japan, in 1983.

See also

 List of Cultural Properties of Japan - paintings (Yamaguchi)
 Yamaguchi Prefectural Museum of Art
 Shimonoseki City Archaeological Museum
 Shimonoseki City Museum of History
 Iwakuni Art Museum

References

External links
  Shimonoseki City Art Museum

Shimonoseki
Museums in Yamaguchi Prefecture
Art museums and galleries in Japan
Museums established in 1983
1983 establishments in Japan